Fisker may refer to:

People
 Henrik Fisker, a Danish-born car designer and businessman based out of Los Angeles, California, US

Companies
 Fisker Coachbuild (founded 2005), a car design firm based in Orange County, California, US
 Fisker Automotive (2007–2014), a car company, based in Irvine, California, US, formed from a merger of Fisker Coachbuild and Quantum Technologies
 Karma Automotive (founded 2014), a Chinese owned car company based in Irvine, California, US, formed from the assets of Fisker Automotive
 Fisker Inc. (founded 2016), a car company, based in Los Angeles, California, US, founded by Henrik Fisker

Other uses
 Fisker (surname)
 Fisker Karma (production 2011-2012), a luxury plug-in hybrid sports sedan produced by Fisker Automotive

See also

 Benetti Fisker 50, the "Fisker 50", a superyacht designed by Henrik Fisker and built by Benetti
 VLF Automotive (Villarreal-Lutz-Fisker Automotive), a car company founded in 2012.